Article One may refer to:

Legal codes 
 Article One of the United States Constitution, pertaining to the powers of the United States Congress
 Article One of the Constitution of India, pertaining to the federal nature of the republic

Other uses
Article One (band), a Canadian Christian rock band
Article One (political party), an Italian political party
Article One Partners, an online patent research formation

See also
Article (disambiguation)